This is a list of English football transfers for the 2005–06 season. Only moves featuring at least one Premier League or Football League Championship club are listed.

The winter transfer window opened on 1 January 2006, although a few transfers took place prior to that date. Players without a club may join one at any time, either during or in between transfer windows. Clubs below Premier League level may also sign players on loan at any time. If need be, clubs may sign a goalkeeper on an emergency loan, if all others are unavailable. The window re-opened in May 2006.

Post-window deals

January transfers

References 

transfers 2005-06
Winter 2005-06
Football transfers winter 2005–06